Bartolomé García de Escañuela, O.F.M. (August 8, 1627 – November 20, 1684) was a Roman Catholic prelate who served as Bishop of Durango (1676–1684) and Bishop of Puerto Rico (1670–1676).

Biography
Bartolomé García de Escañuela was born in Archidona, Spain and ordained a priest in the Order of Friars Minor.
On October 6, 1670, he was appointed by the King of Spain and confirmed by Pope Clement X as Bishop of Puerto Rico. He was consecrated bishop by Galeazzo Marescotti, Apostolic Nuncio to Spain. On November 16, 1676, he was appointed by the King of Spain and confirmed by Pope Innocent XI as Bishop of Durango. He served as Bishop of Durango until his death on November 20, 1684.

References

External links and additional sources
 (for Chronology of Bishops) 
 (for Chronology of Bishops) 
 (for Chronology of Bishops) 
 (for Chronology of Bishops) 

1627 births
1684 deaths
Bishops appointed by Pope Clement X
Bishops appointed by Pope Innocent XI
Franciscan bishops
17th-century Roman Catholic bishops in Puerto Rico
Roman Catholic bishops of Puerto Rico